Mount Tom is a remote  mountain summit located within Olympic National Park in Jefferson County of Washington state. Its nearest higher neighbor is Mount Olympus,  to the east. Due to heavy winter snowfalls, Mount Tom supports the massive White Glacier on its northeast slope, despite its modest elevation. This glacier is the westernmost glacier in the contiguous states, and the summit is the westernmost peak higher than 7000+ feet elevation. Precipitation runoff from the mountain drains into tributaries of the Hoh River.

History

The mountain was originally named Mount Reid in 1890 by the Seattle Press Expedition for Whitelaw Reid, editor and proprietor of the New-York Tribune.

The history of the mountain's present name has two competing stories. One has it named for Thomas M. Hammond, Jr., a surveyor active in the west end of the Olympic Peninsula from 1895 to 1904. The second version has it named after boy scout Thomas Martin, a member of the 1914 first ascent climbing party led by Edmond S. Meany. Meany, who was then the Commissioner of Scouting in Seattle, promised the party of scouts that the first to reach the summit would have it named for him, and the 13-year-old bested his companions. Tom Martin would later become Washington State Treasurer, and a candidate for governor in 1952.

Climate

Based on the Köppen climate classification, Mount Tom is located in the marine west coast climate zone of western North America. Most weather fronts originate in the Pacific Ocean, and travel northeast toward the Olympic Mountains. As fronts approach, they are forced upward by the peaks of the Olympic Range, causing them to drop their moisture in the form of rain or snowfall (Orographic lift). As a result, the Olympics experience high precipitation, especially during the winter months. During winter months, weather is usually cloudy, but, due to high pressure systems over the Pacific Ocean that intensify during summer months, there is often little or no cloud cover during the summer. The months July through September offer the most favorable weather for viewing or climbing this peak.

Geology
The Olympic Mountains are composed of obducted clastic wedge material and oceanic crust, primarily Eocene sandstone, turbidite, and basaltic oceanic crust. The mountains were sculpted during the Pleistocene era by erosion and glaciers advancing and retreating multiple times.

Gallery

See also

 Olympic Mountains
 Geology of the Pacific Northwest
 Geography of Washington (state)

References

External links
 
 Mount Tom weather: Mountain Forecast

Tom
Tom
Tom
Tom